Isak Arvidsson and Fred Simonsson were the defending champions but lost in the first round to Calvin Hemery and Stéphane Robert.

Tuna Altuna and Václav Šafránek won the title after defeating Sriram Balaji and Vijay Sundar Prashanth 6–1, 6–4 in the final.

Seeds

Draw

References
 Main Draw

Båstad Challenger - Doubles
2017 Doubles
Bast